Lotze is a surname. Notable people with the surname include:

 Hermann Lotze (1817–1881), German philosopher and logician
 Hiltrud Lotze (born 1958), German politician

See also
 Lotte (name)

Surnames from given names